In mathematical analysis, Hölder's inequality, named after Otto Hölder, is a fundamental inequality between integrals and an indispensable tool for the study of  spaces.

The special case  gives a form of the Cauchy–Schwarz inequality. Hölder's inequality holds even if  is infinite, the right-hand side also being infinite in that case.

Inspired by Rogers' work,  gave another proof as part of a work developing the concept of convex and concave functions and introducing Jensen's inequality, which was in turn named for work of Johan Jensen building on Hölder's work.

Remarks

Conventions
The brief statement of Hölder's inequality uses some conventions.

 In the definition of Hölder conjugates,  means zero.
 If  , then  and  stand for the (possibly infinite) expressions

 On the right-hand side of Hölder's inequality, 0 × ∞ as well as ∞ × 0 means 0. Multiplying  with ∞ gives ∞.

Estimates for integrable products

and the similar one for  hold, and Hölder's inequality can be applied to the right-hand side.

Generalization for probability measures
If  is a probability space, then   just need to satisfy , rather than being Hölder conjugates. A combination of Hölder's inequality and Jensen's inequality implies that

Notable special cases

Counting measure

Often the following practical form of this is used, for any :

For more than two sums, the following generalisation holds, with real positive exponents    and :

Equality holds iff  .

If  with the counting measure, then we get Hölder's inequality for sequence spaces:

Lebesgue measure

Probability measure
For the probability space  let  denote the expectation operator.

Let   and define  Then  is the Hölder conjugate of  Applying Hölder's inequality to the random variables  and  we obtain

In particular, if the th absolute moment is finite, then the  th absolute moment is finite, too. (This also follows from Jensen's inequality.)

Product measure
For two σ-finite measure spaces  and  define the product measure space by

This can be generalized to more than two  measure spaces.

Vector-valued functions

If the two integrals on the right-hand side are finite, then equality holds if and only if there exist real numbers , not both of them zero, such that

This finite-dimensional version generalizes to functions  and  taking values in a normed space which could be for example a sequence space or an inner product space.

Proof of Hölder's inequality 

There are several proofs of Hölder's inequality; the main idea in the following is Young's inequality for products.

Alternative proof using Jensen's inequality:

Extremal equality

Statement 
Assume that  and let  denote the Hölder conjugate. Then for every ,

where max indicates that there actually is a  maximizing the right-hand side.

Proof of the extremal equality:

Remarks and examples 

Therefore, the above supremum for the indicator function  is zero and the extremal equality fails.
 For  the supremum is in general not attained. As an example, let  and  the counting measure. Define:

Then  For  with  let  denote the smallest natural number with  Then

Applications 

Generalization with more than two functions

Statement 
Assume that   and   such that

where 1/∞ is interpreted as 0 in this equation.

where we interpret any product with a factor of ∞ as ∞ if all factors are positive, but the product is 0 if any factor is 0.

In particular, if  for all  then 

Note: For  contrary to the notation,  is in general not a norm because it doesn't satisfy the triangle inequality.

Proof of the generalization:

Interpolation
Define  as the weighted harmonic mean, that is,

In particular, taking  gives

An application of Hölder gives 

Both Littlewood and Lyapunov imply that if  then  for all

Reverse Hölder inequalities

Two functions 
Assume that  and that the measure space  satisfies .

If

then the reverse Hölder inequality is an equality if and only if

Note: The expressions:

 and 

are not norms, they are just compact notations for

Multiple functions 

The Reverse Hölder inequality (above) can be generalized to the case of multiple functions if all but one conjugate is negative.
That is,

 Let  and  be such that  (hence ). Then

This follows from the symmetric form of the Hölder inequality (see below).

Symmetric forms of Hölder inequality  

It was observed by Aczél and Beckenbach that Hölder's inequality can be put in a more symmetric form, at the price of introducing an extra vector (or function): 

Let  be vectors with positive entries and such that  for all . If  are nonzero real numbers such that , then:

The standard Hölder inequality follows immediately from this symmetric form (and in fact is easily seen to be equivalent to it). The symmetric statement also implies the reverse Hölder inequality (see above).

The result can be extended to multiple vectors: 

If  are nonzero real numbers such that , then:
  if all but one of the numbers  are positive;
  if all but one of the numbers  are negative.

As in the standard Hölder inequalities, there are corresponding statements for infinite sums and integrals.

Conditional Hölder inequality 

Remarks:
 If a non-negative random variable  has infinite expected value, then its conditional expectation is defined by

 On the right-hand side of the conditional Hölder inequality, 0 times ∞ as well as ∞ times 0 means 0. Multiplying  with ∞ gives ∞.

Proof of the conditional Hölder inequality:

Hölder's inequality for increasing seminorms
Let  be an increasing seminorm on  meaning that, for all real-valued functions  we have the following implication (the seminorm is also allowed to attain the value ∞):

Then:

Distances based on Hölder inequality 

Hölder inequality can be used to define statistical dissimilarity measures between probability distributions. Those Hölder divergences are projective: They do not depend on the normalization factor of densities.

See also 
 Cauchy–Schwarz inequality
 Minkowski inequality
 Jensen's inequality
 Young's inequality for products
 Clarkson's inequalities
 Brascamp–Lieb inequality

Citations

References 
 
 .
 . Available at Digi Zeitschriften.
 .
  
 .
 .

External links
.
.
.
Archived at Ghostarchive and the Wayback Machine: .

Inequalities
Probabilistic inequalities
Theorems in functional analysis
Articles containing proofs
Lp spaces